Ndidi Nwosu (6 June 1979 – 1 March 2020) was a Nigerian powerlifter who had an upset victory at the 2016 Summer Paralympics. She lifted 140 kilograms. Ndidi became a professional powerlifter in 2008. She  won gold in the Rio Paralympic Games in 2016. She also won gold in the 2018 Commonwealth Games which took place in Australia. she sustained an injury in the 2018 Commonwealth Games. The injury affected her spine and led to her having different surgeries in Owerri, Imo State Nigeria. After these surgeries, she was never the same again and could not participate in subsequent competitions.

References 

1979 births
2020 deaths
Female powerlifters
Paralympic powerlifters of Nigeria
Nigerian powerlifters
Powerlifters at the 2016 Summer Paralympics
Paralympic gold medalists for Nigeria
Paralympic medalists in powerlifting
African Games gold medalists for Nigeria
African Games medalists in weightlifting
Commonwealth Games medallists in powerlifting
Commonwealth Games gold medallists for Nigeria
Powerlifters at the 2018 Commonwealth Games
Competitors at the 2015 African Games
Medalists at the 2016 Summer Paralympics
Medallists at the 2018 Commonwealth Games